Ilia Topuria (born January 21, 1997) is a Georgian and Spanish mixed martial artist who competes in the Lightweight and Featherweight divisions of the Ultimate Fighting Championship. As of December 13, 2022, he is #9 in the UFC featherweight rankings.

Background

Topuria was born in Halle Westfalen, Germany to Georgian parents. At the age of seven he moved to Georgia with his family where he started practicing Greco-Roman Wrestling at school. At the age of 15 he moved to live in Alicante in Spain, where he started practicing martial arts at the Climent Club. In 2015, he made his debut as a professional in local competitions.

Mixed martial arts career

Early career
After starting his career with 4 straight submission wins on the Spanish regional scene and winning a belt in Mix Fight Events promotion. In 2018 he made his first international fight in Cage MMA Finland. In the same year, in May, he became the first Georgian black belt in Brazilian Jiu-jitsu alongside his brother Alex Topuria. Months later he received the opportunity to fight for the Cage Warriors Bantamweight Championship at the Lotto Arena in Antwerp, Belgium. Ilia failed to make the agreed weight so despite winning the fight quickly, he did not get the belt.

In 2019 he signed with Brave Combat Federation. Ilia made his debut in the promotion in Bogota, Colombia, defeating opponent Luis Gomez in the first round by submission; which leads him to get the award for best performance of the night. On November 15, 2019, in Bahrain, he wins his second fight in BRAVE by defeating Steven Goncalves by KO in the first round.

Ultimate Fighting Championship
Topuria, as a replacement for Seung Woo Choi, took a bout on short notice against Youssef Zalal on October 11, 2020 at UFC Fight Night: Moraes vs. Sandhagen. Topuria won the fight via unanimous decision.

Topuria faced Damon Jackson on December 5, 2020, at UFC on ESPN: Hermansson vs. Vettori. He won the fight via knockout in round one.

Topuria faced Ryan Hall on July 10, 2021, at UFC 264. He won the fight via knockout in round one.

Topuria was scheduled to face Movsar Evloev on January 22, 2022, at UFC 270. However, Topuria was pulled from the card due to a medical issue related to cutting weight and the bout was cancelled.

Topuria faced Jai Herbert, replacing Mike Davis, on March 19, 2022, at UFC Fight Night 204. Topuria suffered a knockdown from a head kick in round one, but recovered and won the fight via knockout in round two. With this win, he received the Performance of the Night award.

Topuria was scheduled to face Edson Barboza on October 29, 2022, at UFC Fight Night 213. However, Barboza withdrew in late September due to a knee injury and the bout was cancelled.

Topuria faced Bryce Mitchell on December 10, 2022, at UFC 282. He won the fight via submission in round two. This win earned him the Performance of the Night award.

Championships and accomplishments

Mixed martial arts
 Ultimate Fighting Championship
 Performance of the Night (Two times) 
 Mix Fight Events
 MFE Featherweight Championship (One time)
MMAjunkie.com
2022 December Submission of the Month

Controversies 
A video surfaced on January 4, 2023, that showed a man shoving Topuria a few times, which was unprovoked, in a bar in Spain, and Topuria retaliating with a few punches before the scuffle was broken up.

Mixed martial arts record

|- 
|Win
|align=center|13–0
|Bryce Mitchell
|Submission (arm-triangle choke)
|UFC 282
|
|align=center|2
|align=center|3:10
|Las Vegas, Nevada, United States
|
|-
|Win
|align=center|12–0
|Jai Herbert
|KO (punches)
|UFC Fight Night: Volkov vs. Aspinall
|
|align=center|2
|align=center|1:07
|London, England
|
|-
|Win
|align=center|11–0
|Ryan Hall
|KO (punches)
|UFC 264
|
|align=center|1
|align=center|4:47
|Las Vegas, Nevada, United States
|
|-
|Win
|align=center|10–0
|Damon Jackson
|KO (punch)
|UFC on ESPN: Hermansson vs. Vettori
|
|align=center|1
|align=center|2:38
|Las Vegas, Nevada, United States
|
|-
|Win
|align=center|9–0
|Youssef Zalal
|Decision (unanimous)
|UFC Fight Night: Moraes vs. Sandhagen 
|
|align=center|3
|align=center|5:00
|Abu Dhabi, United Arab Emirates
| 
|-
|Win
|align=center| 8–0
|Stephen Goncalves
|KO (punches)
|Brave CF 29
|
|align=center| 1
|align=center| 3:42
|Isa Town, Bahrain
| 
|-
|Win
|align=center|7–0
|Luis Gomez
|Submission (triangle straight armbar)
|Brave CF 26
|
|align=center|1
|align=center|1:15
|Bogotá, Colombia
|
|-
|Win
|align=center|6–0
|Brian Bouland
|Technical Submission (anaconda choke)
|Cage Warriors 94
|
|align=center|1
|align=center|1:39
|Antwerp, Belgium
|
|-
|Win
|align=center|5–0
|Mika Hamalainen
|Submission (guillotine choke)
|CAGE 43
|
|align=center|1
|align=center|3:35
|Helsinki, Finland
|
|-
|Win
|align=center| 4–0
|Jhon Guarin
|Submission (guillotine choke)
|Mix Fight Events 2
|
|align=center|2
|align=center|2:50
|Valencia, Spain
|
|-
|Win
|align=center|3–0
|Daniel Vasquez
|Submission (rear-naked choke)
|Mix Fight Events
|
|align=center|1
|align=center|1:50
|Alicante, Spain
|
|-
|Win
|align=center|2–0
|Kalil Martin El Chalibi
|Submission (rear-naked choke)
|Climent Show MMA 4
|
|align=center|1
|align=center|1:03
|Alicante, Spain
|
|-
|Win
|align=center|1–0
|Francisco Javier Asprilla
|Submission (triangle choke)
|West Coast Warriors
|
|align=center|1
|align=center|3:30
|Valencia, Spain
|

See also 
 List of current UFC fighters
 List of male mixed martial artists
 List of undefeated mixed martial artists

References

External links
 
 

1996 births
Living people
Male mixed martial artists from Georgia (country)
Spanish male mixed martial artists
Featherweight mixed martial artists
Mixed martial artists utilizing Greco-Roman wrestling
Mixed martial artists utilizing Brazilian jiu-jitsu
Georgian emigrants to Spain
Mingrelians
Spanish people of Georgian descent
Ultimate Fighting Championship male fighters
Spanish practitioners of Brazilian jiu-jitsu
Brazilian jiu-jitsu practitioners from Georgia (country)
People awarded a black belt in Brazilian jiu-jitsu